Eupithecia importuna is a moth in the family Geometridae. It is found in China (Shansi).

References

Moths described in 1981
importuna
Moths of Asia